Alexandra Nancarrow (born 1 September 1993, in Canberra) is an Australian former tennis player. Nancarrow has a singles career-high ranking by the Women's Tennis Association (WTA) of 385, achieved on 10 November 2014. She also has a WTA doubles career high ranking of 346, achieved on 2 February 2015. In her career, Nancarrow won four singles and 20 doubles titles on tournaments of the ITF Circuit.

Nancarrow made her WTA Tour debut at the 2015 Hobart International, in the doubles event, partnering Storm Sanders. The following week, she made her senior Grand Slam debut at the 2015 Australian Open, partnering Maddison Inglis in the women's doubles.

ITF finals

Singles (4–5)

Doubles (20–11)

References

External links
 
 
 

1993 births
Living people
Australian female tennis players
Sportspeople from Canberra
Tennis people from the Australian Capital Territory
Australian expatriate sportspeople in Spain
21st-century Australian women